R44 may refer to:
 R44 (New York City Subway car)
 R44 (South Africa)
 , a destroyer of the Royal Navy
 R44: Risk of explosion if heated under confinement, a risk phrase
 Robinson R44, a helicopter
 CCITT R.44, a telex standard